The 2011–12 BYU Cougars women's basketball team represented Brigham Young University in the 2011–12 college basketball season. This was head coach Jeff Judkins eleventh season at BYU. The Cougars, played in their first season in the West Coast Conference and played their home games at the Marriott Center. The Cougars won the 2011 Hukilau Invitational and the 2012 West Coast Conference Basketball Tournament, earning themselves a 10-Seed in the NCAA Tournament. They lost in the first round to DePaul.

Before the season
The Lady Cougars were picked to finish second in the WCC behind only Gonzaga in the pre-season polls.

2011-12 media
The Lady Cougars got more exposure than ever before for the 2011-12 season. Every Lady Cougars home game, except for the game against St. Mary's, was featured nationally on BYUtv Sports. Robbie Bullough acted as the play-by-play man, though Dave McCann and Jared Johnson were assigned a few games. Kristen Kozlowski served as the analyst for all BYUtv Sports broadcasts. Lakia Holmes served as the sideline reporter for the Winter Semester, but after she graduated multiple sideline reporters would be used for BYUtv.

BYU Radio Sports Network Affiliates

All Lady Cougar games that don't conflict with men's basketball or football games were featured live on BYU Radio found nationwide on Dish Network 980, on Sirius XM 143, and online at www.byuradio.org. Games not broadcast on BYU Radio were 11/19 (at Weber State), 12/3 (vs. Syracuse), 12/31 (at Saint Mary's), 1/7 (at San Francisco), 1/19 (at Loyola Marymount), and 2/2 (at Pepperdine). However internet streaming of all those games was available at the opposing schools website.

Roster

Schedule and results
Source

|-
!colspan=12 style="background:#002654; color:#FFFFFF;"| Exhibition

|-
!colspan=12 style="background:#002654; color:#FFFFFF;"| Regular Season

|-
!colspan=12 style="background:#FFFFFF; color:#002654;"| 2012 West Coast Conference women's basketball tournament

|-
!colspan=12 style="background:#FFFFFF; color:#002654;"| 2012 NCAA Division I women's basketball tournament

Game Summaries

Game-by-Game TV and Internet Streaming Announcers

Rankings

See also
BYU Cougars women's basketball

References

BYU Cougars women's basketball seasons
Byu
BYU
BYU Cougars
BYU Cougars